Pseudactinoceras is an extinct nautiloid cephalopod included in the order Pseudorthocerida and the namesake of the family Pseudactinoceratidae (Sweet, 1964).

Description
Pseudactinocras are slightly depressed longiconic cyrtocones with a large siphuncle located between the center and ventral margin. Early siphuncle segments, in the juvenile phragmocone are suborthochoantic; later segments, in the mature phragmocone, become cyrtochoanitic, nummuloidal, broader than long. Parietal deposits lining the interior of the siphuncle grow more prominently forward than backward, with canals slightly anterior of segment centers. Thick cameral deposits develop ventrally, but are only thin dorsally (Sweet, 1964).

Taxonomy
Pseudactinoceras was named by Schindewolf in 1943 (Sweet, 1964) and is the type genus of the pseudorthocerid family, Pseudactinoceratidae. The type species, P. promiscuum, came from the Lower Carboniferous (Visean = middle Mississippian) of Germany.

See also

 List of nautiloids

References
 Sweet, W.C. 1964. Nautiloidea-Orthocerida, Treatise on Invertebrate Paleontology Part K, Mollusca 3; Geological Soc. of America and Univ. Kansas Press.
  Paleobiology Database 12/10/09
Sepkoski's Online Genus Database (CEPHALOPODA)

Nautiloids
Late Devonian first appearances
Late Devonian animals
Mississippian extinctions